In computer graphics, the Cyrus–Beck algorithm is a generalized algorithm for line clipping. It was designed to be more efficient than the Cohen–Sutherland algorithm, which uses repetitive clipping.  Cyrus–Beck is a general algorithm and can be used with a convex polygon clipping window, unlike Cohen-Sutherland, which can be used only on a rectangular clipping area.

Here the parametric equation of a line in the view plane is

where .

Now to find the intersection point with the clipping window, we calculate the value of the dot product. Let  be a point on the clipping plane .

Calculate :

 if < 0, vector pointed towards interior;
 if = 0, vector pointed parallel to plane containing ;
 if > 0, vector pointed away from interior.

Here  stands for normal of the current clipping plane (pointed away from interior).

By this we select the point of intersection of line and clipping window where (dot product is 0) and hence clip the line.

Notes

See also
Algorithms used for the same purpose:

 Cohen–Sutherland algorithm
 Liang–Barsky algorithm
 Nicholl–Lee–Nicholl algorithm
 Fast clipping

References in other media:

 Tron: Uprising

References
 Mike Cyrus, Jay Beck. "Generalized two- and three-dimensional clipping". Computers & Graphics, 1978: 23–28.
 James D. Foley. Computer graphics: principles and practice. Addison-Wesley Professional, 1996. p. 117.

External links
 https://web.archive.org/web/20101203041134/http://cs1.bradley.edu/public/jcm/cs535CyrusBeck.html
 https://web.archive.org/web/20110725233122/http://softsurfer.com/Archive/algorithm_0111/algorithm_0111.htm

Line clipping algorithms